was daimyō of Tateyama Domain during late-Edo period Japan.

Biography
Inaba Masami was the eldest son of the previous daimyō of Tateyama Domain, Inaba Masamori. On his father's death in 1820, he succeeded to the head of the Tateyama Inaba clan and the position of daimyō of Tateyama. In 1862, he was appointed as a Wakadoshiyori in the administration of the Tokugawa shogunate under Shōgun Tokugawa Iemochi. He resigned the title in 1864, with instructions to strengthen Japan's naval defenses against the increasing aggressive incursions of foreign black ships, and supported Katsu Kaishū’s efforts to create the Kobe Naval Training Center. He was reappointed as a Wakadoshiyori in 1865, and rose to the positions of Rōjū, Commissioner of the Army and Fleet Admiral of the Tokugawa Navy under Shōgun Tokugawa Yoshinobu. He held these posts until 1868. However, with the start of the Boshin War, he refused to take an active role against the Satchō Alliance and went into retirement at Tateyama Castle, turning the domain over to his son Inaba Masayoshi. He died in 1879.

Inaba Masami was married to a daughter of Suwa Tadamichi, daimyō of Suwa Domain in Shinano Province.

References 
 Papinot, Edmund. (1906) Dictionnaire d'histoire et de géographie du japon. Tokyo: Librarie Sansaisha...Click link for digitized 1906 Nobiliaire du japon (2003)
 The content of much of this article was derived from that of the corresponding article on Japanese Wikipedia.

Fudai daimyo
1815 births
1879 deaths
Masami
Wakadoshiyori
Rōjū
Meiji Restoration